Camille Van De Casteele (Sint-Andries, 27 June 1902 – Bruges, 12 February 1961) was a Belgian professional road bicycle racer.

Major results

1925
Paris-Caen
1926
Omloop der Leiestreek
Paris-Caen
Tour de France:
Winner stage 16
1927
Tour de France:
Winner stage 4

External links 

Official Tour de France results for Camille van de Casteele

Belgian male cyclists
1902 births
1961 deaths
Belgian Tour de France stage winners
Sportspeople from Bruges
Cyclists from West Flanders